Luis Godoy (born 11 June 1952) is a Colombian boxer. He competed in the men's light welterweight event at the 1976 Summer Olympics. At the 1976 Summer Olympics, he lost to Christian Sittler of Austria.

References

1952 births
Living people
Colombian male boxers
Olympic boxers of Colombia
Boxers at the 1976 Summer Olympics
Place of birth missing (living people)
Light-welterweight boxers